Askiz (Khakas: , Asxıs) is an urban-type settlement in Askizsky District of the Republic of Khakassia, Russia. Population:

References

Notes

Sources

Urban-type settlements in Khakassia